LVT may refer to:

 Land value tax, a levy on the value of land
 Landing Vehicle Tracked, an amphibious military vehicle
 Leasehold valuation tribunal, in England
 LogoVisual thinking, a thinking methodology